Nostalgia for apartheid is feelings of nostalgia for the apartheid system in South Africa, as well as more general nostalgia for life in South Africa from 1948 to 1994. Such feeling is widespread in South Africa, and diverse, ranging from a desire for a return to racial segregation, to a feeling that the apartheid regime, whilst brutal and oppressive, ran the country more efficiently. Whilst found amongst white South Africans where it is associated with white supremacism and Afrikaner nationalism, it also exists amongst black South Africans, where it is associated with disappointment at the continued inequality, and unfulfilled expectations of improved standards of living. It is similar to Soviet nostalgia, where nostalgia also arose for a repressive regime following the fall of that regime, including by those opressed by it.

See also 
Ostalgie
Yugonostalgia
Myth of the clean Wehrmacht
Lost Cause of the Confederacy

References 

Apartheid
Nostalgia
History of South Africa by period